The 23345 / 46 Varanasi Junction–Shaktinagar Terminal Intercity Express is an Express  train belonging to Indian Railways East Central Railway zone that runs between  and  in India.

Coaches
The 23345 / 46 Varanasi Junction–Shaktinagar Terminal Intercity Express has five general unreserved & two SLR (seating with luggage rake) coaches . It does not carry a pantry car coach.

As is customary with most train services in India, coach composition may be amended at the discretion of Indian Railways depending on demand.

Service

Routing

Traction
As the route is going to be electrified, a  Patratu based WDM-3A diesel locomotive pulls the train to its destination.

References

External links
23345 Intercity Express at India Rail Info
23346 Intercity Express at India Rail Info

Intercity Express (Indian Railways) trains
Passenger trains originating from Varanasi
Railway services introduced in 2013